The Colville people (Sinixt: Enselxcin), are a Native American people of the Pacific Northwest. The name Colville comes from association with Fort Colville, named after Andrew Colvile of the Hudson's Bay Company. Okanagan: sx̌ʷyʔiɬpx) Earlier, outsiders often called them Scheulpi, Chualpay, or Swhy-ayl-puh; the French traders called them Les Chaudières ("the Kettles") in reference to Kettle Falls. The neighboring Coeur d'Alene called them Sqhwiyi̱'ɫpmsh and the Spokane knew them as Sxʷyelpetkʷ.

History

The Colville tribe was originally located in eastern Washington on the Colville River and the area of the Columbia River between Kettle Falls and the town of Hunters.

The tribe's history is tied with Kettle Falls, an important salmon fishing resource, and an important post of the Hudson's Bay Company, which brought the advantages and disadvantages of contact with people of European heritage. In 1846, the Jesuit St. Paul's Mission was established. Through its influence nearly all the upper Columbia tribes were Christianized.

In 1872, the Colville tribe was relocated to an Indian reservation in eastern Washington the named after them. It is inhabited and managed by the Confederated Tribes of the Colville Reservation, which is a federally recognized tribe comprising twelve bands. The twelve bands are the Methow, Okanogan, Arrow Lakes, Sanpoil, Colville, Nespelem, Chelan, Entiat, Moses-Columbia, Wenatchi, Nez Perce, and Palus.

Eight of these related bands are the names of rivers that flow off of the eastern slopes of the North Cascades or the Okanagon Highlands of eastern Washington.  Several of these rivers have small towns or communities where the rivers flow into the Columbia River. Beginning in the Southwest the rivers in order as you go north and then east are the: Wenatchee (Town of Wenatchee), Entiat (Town of Entiat), Chelan (Town of Chelan), Methow (Town of Methow, upstream of the confluence with the Columbia), Okanogan (Town of Okanogan, upstream of the Confluence), Nespelem (Tribal community of Nespelem, upstream of the confluence), Sanpoil (Tribal community of Sanpoil, on the Sanpoil arm of Lake Roosevelt), and Colville (Town of Colville, upstream of the confluence). The Arrow Lakes are upstream on the Columbia River a little ways above the border in British Columbia. The Moses Coulee, Moses-Columbia, is an Ice Age Canyon (coulee) just south of the Columbia River west of Coulee City on U.S. Highway 2. Not to be confused, Coulee City is located in the Grand Coulee, a similar and more famous Ice Age Canyon that lies east of the Moses Coulee.

The Nez Perce are the descendants of Chief Joseph band which came from Northeast Oregon.  As part of the conditions of surrender Chief Joseph and his band were not allowed to return to their home in Oregon and were eventually re-located to the Colville reservation after the so called "Flight of the Nez Perce" in 1877. The Nez Perce (not including the small group re-located to Colville) are located on the Nez Perce Indian Reservation in West central Idaho along the Clearwater River.

Mooney (1928) estimated the number of the Colville at 1,000 as of 1780, but Lewis and Clark placed it at 2,500, a figure also fixed upon by Teit (1930). In 1870, there were 616; in 1900, 298; in 1904, 321; in 1907, 334; and in 1937, 322.

Language
The Colville language or N̓x̌ʷʔiłpcən is a one of six dialects of Colville-Okanagan historically spoken by the "Syilx peoples" including Northern Okanagan and Southern/Lower Okanagan (Sinkaietk), Methow, Sanpoil (Nesilextcl'n), Nespelem (sometimes considered a Sanpoil subtribe), Colville, and Sinixt (Senijextee/Arrow Lakes Band) peoples. Syilx is the historic autonym of the Okanagan peoples and today a political term for land and cultural claims for all Colville-Okanagan-speaking peoples.

Together with Wenatchee-Columbian, Spokane-Kalispel-Bitterroot, and Coeur d'Alene, Colville-Okanagan belong to the four Southern Interior Salishan languages of the Plateau.

Notable people

Jim Boyd, musician
Joe Feddersen, artist
Kimberly Norris Guerrero, actress
Lawney Reyes artist, curator, and memoirist

Notes

External links

 
Native American tribes in Washington (state)